Yagodinska Cave is a cave in the Rhodope Mountains, southern Bulgaria. It is included in the 100 Tourist Sites of Bulgaria under № 89. It is named after the homonymous village nearby. With a total length of 10,500 m, Yagodinska is the third longest cave in the country after Duhlata and Orlova Chuka and the longest in the Rhodopes. Yagodinska Cave is home to 11 species of bats.

Location 
Yagodinska Cave is on the right bank of the river Buynovska, a tributary to the Vacha, on the slopes of the Buynovo gorge — the longest gorge in Bulgaria. It is in Smolyan Province at 20 km to the south of the town of Devin and 3 km to south-west of the village of Yagodina. The cave is accessible through the road Devin–Dospat and has a parking lot. The cave entrance is at an altitude of 930 m.

Exploration and description 

The exploration of the cave commenced in 1963 by the Speleological Club of Chepelare led by Dimitar Raychev. Initially 8,500 m have been explored and 2,000 m more galleries were discovered during the second mapping of the cave in 1982-1986. The age of the cave is estimated at 275,000 years.

Yagodinska Cave is 10,500 m long and has three levels, of which only a 1,100 m path in the lowest level was electrified in 1971–1982 and opened for tourists. The entrance and the exit for that level are artificial tunnels with a length of 150 and 80 m respectively. The altitude of the entrance and the exit is 930 m and 937 m respectively. The temperature in the show cave is constant all year round at 6ºС; the humidity is 85%–91%.

Yagodinska contains a very large number of cave formations, or speleothems, including stalactites, stalagmites, stalagnates, flowstone, draperies and cave pearls.

The natural entrance leads to the uppermost level, where an ancient dwelling dated to the 4th millennium BC was discovered. Excavations have proven that the dwelling was an important centre producing ceramics. The clay was extracted from the interior of the cave and from the bed of the Boynovska River. The pottery was baked in clay furnaces. The inhabitants abandoned the site as a result of a collapse caused by an earthquake.

Fauna 
Yagodinska Cave is an important site for bats due to the large length of its galleries. The cave is home to 11 species of bats. Of these, six species are of conservation importance in Europe: the greater and the lesser horseshoe bats, the greater and lesser mouse-eared bats, Bechstein's bat and Geoffroy's bat.

List of the recorded species:

 greater horseshoe bat (Rhinolophus ferrumequinum)
 lesser horseshoe bat (Rhinolophus hipposideros)
 Bechstein's bat (Myotis bechsteinii)
 Geoffroy's bat (Myotis emarginatus)
 greater mouse-eared bat (Myotis myotis)
 lesser mouse-eared bat (Myotis blythii)
 whiskered bat (Myotis mystacinus)
 Daubenton's bat (Myotis daubentonii)
 serotine bat (Eptesicus serotinus)
 brown long-eared bat (Plecotus auritus)
 grey long-eared bat  (Plecotus austriacus)

See also

Geography of Bulgaria
List of caves in Bulgaria
List of protected areas of Bulgaria
List of rock formations in Bulgaria

Citations

External links 

  
 
 
 

Tourist attractions in Smolyan Province
Landforms of Smolyan Province
Show caves in Bulgaria
Rhodope Mountains